The Cuban Liberal Union is a liberal party in Cuba. The party is a member of Liberal International.

See also

List of political parties in Cuba
Liberalism worldwide
List of liberal parties
Liberalism in Cuba

References

External links
 

Cuban democracy movements
Liberal International
Liberal parties in Cuba
Political parties in Cuba